The People's Republic of China now has multiple and originally separate Scouting activities within its borders. The newly founded Scout Association of the People's Republic of China (中华人民共和国,童军总会) serves Rover Scouts and Venture Scouts 15 years old and above in both genders.
Registered units of this association are the Shanghai Scout, Rover Alpha Fujian Crew, Guangdong Rover, Rover "A" Jiangsu Crew. Scouts of this association took part in Jamboree on the Air and Jamboree on the Internet 2009 and the association issued several memorabilia for these events.  In close connection with the Scout Association of the People's Republic of China is the Team Delta Rovers (中国三角洲成人童军队).

History

Pre-1949

Post-1949
The Scouting Movement was banned by the Chinese Communist Party after it consolidated its power throughout the Mainland following its victory in the Chinese Civil War 1949. However, Scouting was re-introduced in Shanghai and Shanghai Scout Club (currently known as Shanghai Scout) was founded in December 2006. Many camps and training activities were organized. Scout Leaders were trained (base on Wood Badge Training Scheme provided by WOSM APR). In August 2008, the Scout Association of the People's Republic of China was officially founded. From there, the movement spread to other provinces. However, the organization is not officially supported by the government of China.

Currently, the movement has one National Council, two Regional Councils, four District Councils and nine Crews/Troop from four different Provinces (Fujian, Shanghai, Guangdong and Jiangsu).

Organization/Movement
The organization/movement is governed according to the statutory Policy, Organization and Rules (POR) of the association. All members join the association voluntarily and it is open for all who are willing to follow the principle of the association, the Scout Promise and the Scout Laws.  Any Race, Gender and Social Class is welcome.  The only limit is the minimum age of 15 years.

Scout Promise and Laws

Scout Promise

On my honor I promise that I will do my best
To do my duty to the President and to my Country;
To help other people at all times;
To obey the Scout Laws.

Simplified Mandarin 
以我的名誉，我保证我会尽我最大的努力；
尽我的责任给总统和我的国家；
随时帮助他人；
遵守童子军法律。

Scout Law
1. A Scout's honor is to be trusted.
2. A Scout is loyal.
3. A Scout's duty is to be useful and to help others.
4. A Scout is a friend to all and a brother/sister to every other Scout.
5. A Scout is courteous. 
6. A Scout is a friend to animals. 
7. A Scout obeys orders of his/her parents, leader or Scoutmaster without question. 
8. A Scout smiles and whistles under all difficulties. 
9. A Scout is thrifty.
10. A Scout is clean in thought, word and deed.

Simplified Mandarin 
1.童子军的荣誉是值得信任的。
2.童子军是忠诚的。
3.童子军的职责是有用和帮助他人。
4.童子军是大家的朋友，是其他童子军的兄弟/姐妹。
5.童子军是有礼貌的。
6.童子军是动物的朋友。
7.侦察兵服从他/她父母的命令，毫无疑问的领袖或小队长。
8.侦察员在各种困难下都能笑出声来。
9.童子军是节俭的。
10.童子军在思想、言行上都是干净的。

Scout Sign and salute
To do the Scout sign, the middle three fingers of the right hand are raised and the thumb covering the little finger, with the upper arm held horizontally and the forearm vertically. The three raised fingers represent the three fundamental parts of the Scout Promise, and the thumb over the little finger represents the strong protecting the weak. The Scout sign is used whenever pledging the Scout Promise.
To do the Scout salute, do the Scout sign and then the middle finger is moved until it touches the right eyebrow.

Chief Commissioner
The Chief Commissioner or CC is the administrative head of the Scout Association of the People's Republic of China. The first Chief Commissioner was appointed in August 2008. He is Rover Ye and was the first Wood Badge holder (two beads) in the People's Republic of China (based on the Wood Badge Training Scheme provided by the World Organization of the Scout Movement Asia-Pacific Scout Region).

Sections
Venture Scout – Between 15 and 17 years. Motto: "BE PREPARED". 
Senior Venture Scout – Between 17 and 18.5 years. Motto: "LOOK WIDE". 
Rover Scout – Adults (18 years above). Motto: "SERVICE".
The Scout Association of the People's Republic of China does not have the Cub Scout (age 10 to 12 years) and Scout (age 13 to 15 years) sections which are standard in most countries in the Scouting Movement; in China all boys and girls in this age group are required to be part of the Young Pioneers of China. The Association respects and agrees with the government's objectives and policies.

Training scheme/program
The Scout Association of the People's Republic of China has its own Training Scheme/Program for all three sections (Venture, Senior Venture and Rovers Scouts). The Scouts will be awarded with badges after completion of each training scheme.

Venture Scout
Tenderfoot Badge
3rd Class Badge
2nd Class Badge
1st Class Badge
Grey Scout Cord

Senior Venture Scout
Citizenship Badge
Scout Craft Badge
Project Badge
Expedition Badge
Service Badge
Yellow Scout Cord
The Senior Venture Scout (who has achieved the Grey Scout Cord and the Yellow Scout Cord) will attend the standardization and when successful, awarded the Premier Scout Award (which is the highest for Senior Venture Scout).

Rover Scout
Tenderfoot Badge (applicable for New Rover Scout/Vigil)
Scout Craft Award
Rambler's Award
Project Award
Service Award
The Rover Scout will attend the standardization and when successful, he/she will be awarded the President Award (which is the highest for Rover Scout).

Scout Leader/Wood Badge training scheme
Good Rover Scout will be given a chance to be a Scout Leader (or known as Scoutmaster / Scouter) in a Troop/Crew/Group. He/She will attend the Wood Badge Training Scheme organized by the association. The whole training takes about 15 months. Successful Scout Leaders will be awarded the Wood Badge (2 beads).

See also
 Scouting and Guiding in Mainland China

External links 
 Scout Association of the People's Republic of China
 Shanghai Scout
 Rover "A" Jiangsu Crew
 Rover Alpha Fujian Crew
 Guangdong Rover

References

Youth organizations based in China
Scouting and Guiding in China